SK Kalve is a Latvian rugby club based in Riga. It was formed after the merging of SK Ovals and RK 1964, also known as Ādažu Čipši and Remus presumably after sponsors.

References

Latvian rugby union teams
Sport in Riga